Route 33 is a , secondary north–south state highway in the U.S. state of Connecticut, from Westport to Ridgefield.

Route description
Route 33 begins at an intersection with Route 136 and I-95 in Westport.  It heads north, intersecting with US 1, Route 57, and Merritt Parkway (Route 15) before crossing into Norwalk.  Route 33 barely crosses the northeastern corner of Norwalk before continuing into Wilton. Where it passes through the Wilton Center Historic District.

In Wilton, Route 33 heads northwest, crossing Route 53 before joining US 7 and Route 106, in that order, to form a triple concurrency.  Route 106 leaves the concurrency shortly after joining, and US 7 and Route 33 continue northwest for approximately another mile before US 7 turns off to the north. Route 33 continues northwest and west before turning north into Ridgefield.

In Ridgefield, Route 33 continues north to end at an intersection with Route 35.

In Wilton, Route 33 is a Scenic Route known as Ridgefield Road from Old Ridgewood Road #1 to the Ridgefield town line.

History

Route 33 was commissioned in 1932 from parts of former 1920s state highways 304 and 176. In 1967, the northern end was truncated from New York state line to the intersection with modern Route 116 in Ridgefield. In 1978, the concurrency with Route 35 was deleted and the northern end truncated from Route 116 to its current location at Route 35.

Major intersections

References

033
Norwalk, Connecticut
Ridgefield, Connecticut
Westport, Connecticut
Wilton, Connecticut
Transportation in Fairfield County, Connecticut